Maj Gen Abe Notshweleka was a General Officer in the South African Army from the artillery. He was born in 1954 in Kempton Park and grew up in Tembisa where he matriculated. He joined the uMkhonto we Sizwe's underground structures. He completed a Teaching diploma from a College of Education in Bophuthatswana and taught in schools around Mafikeng.  He went into exile through Botswana and later in Malanje, Angola where he completed military training. He later served as a MK Camp Commander of Malanje. He stayed in Mozambique and in Tanzania where he was a Military Attaché.

Military career 

He specialized in artillery while in exile and integrated into the South African National Defence Force with the rank of a lieutenant colonel on 27 April 1994.

He completed the bridging training at the  School of Artillery in Klipdrift. He served as a staff officer at 4 Artillery Regiment and the Directorate of Artillery in the office of the Chief of the Army from 1995 to 1998. Lt. Col. Notshweleka completed the Senior Command and Staff Duties Course in 1999 and Executive National Security Program in 2001. 

He was appointed the first Chief of Staff  of the newly established Artillery Type Formation from 1999 to 2001. He was promoted to the rank of brigadier general on 1 October 2001 and was General Officer Commanding Artillery Formation from 2001 to 2010. He was appointed at the CD Defence Acquisition at the Defence Secretariat from 2010 until he retired with pension in July 2014. He served as a Special Advisor to Minister of Police (Minister Bheki Cele) in his civilian life. He died at 1 Military Hospital, Thaba Tshwane in 2021.

Honours and awards

Medals

Identification badges

References 

1954 births
2021 deaths
South African Army generals
South African military officers
People from Kempton Park, Gauteng
UMkhonto we Sizwe personnel